Sahar Jafari Jozani (born on  in San Francisco) is an Iranian-American TV and cinema actress and writer. She is the daughter of Iranian director, Masoud Jafari Jozani.

Filmography

Television
Friendship Agency
Sponsor
The Dots (TV series)
Anger and Reconciliation
Dar Chashm-e Baad
Mozaffar's Garden
Faza Navardan
Man of Many Many Faces
All My Children
Laughter Bomb
Bitter Coffee
Amnesia
Mozaffar's Treasure

Cinema
Stone Lion
A man, A Bear
Adolescence
Her Eyes
Seven Songs
invitation (2008 film)
Iran Burger
Behind the Wall of Silence

References

External links

 

Living people
1978 births
People from San Francisco
People from Tehran
Actresses from Tehran
Iranian women writers
Iranian film actresses
Iranian television actresses
Islamic Azad University alumni
American people of Iranian descent